Beal High School is a coeducational secondary school and sixth form with academy status, located in Redbridge, Greater London, England.

The school begins at Year 7 and continues with compulsory schooling through Year 11. Years 12 and 13 form the optional sixth form.
In 2014, a business hub and media block were added.
The school also has a Communications and Learning Department (CLD Unit) for students on the autistic spectrum.

Beal High School is also the sponsor of The Forest Academy (formerly Hainault Forest High School), and the Beacon Business Innovation Hub (BBIH). These schools, alongside the autistic provision form the Beacon Multi Academy Trust.

History

The school converted to academy status on 1 February 2014. The name of the Trust changed from Beal Multi-Academy Trust to Beacon Multi-Academy Trust in 2016.

Staff
The headteacher is Kathryn Burns. The headteacher before was Miss Wilmot.  John Manuel, who preceded Wilmot, became head of the Grammar School in 1972 and oversaw the transition from Grammar to Comprehensive. The last Head of Beal, as purely a Grammar school, was Dr. Elvet Lewis (1904–81). In March 2016, it was announced that Sue Snowdon was to retire from her position as Headteacher in April 2016.

In December 2006, the school was  designated as a 'Highly Achieving Specialist School'. Ofsted rate the school as  Outstanding.

The school offers extra-curricular activities including concerts and musical theatre productions. Students get the chance to participate in debating, enterprise activities a wide range of sport teams and musical groups.

Notable former pupils 

 Simon Amstell (born 1979) television presenter and comedian
 Yolanda Brown (born 1982) jazz musician
 Joe Ellis-Grewal (born 1992) cricketer
 Nick Frost (born 1972) comedian and actor
 Marc Seigar (born 1971) - astronomer, author, and academic leader
 Louise Wener (born 1966) musician and author 
 Hazel Keech (Born 1987)  model, Bollywood actress and dancer
 Penny Lancaster (born 1971) model and photographer 
 Danny Lee Wynter (born 1982) actor
 Josh Dasilva

Beal Grammar School for Boys
 Gareth Davis, Chairman since 2010 of William Hill (bookmaker)
 Bill Hagerty (born 1939) writer, author and critic, former national newspaper editor, Editor 1991-92 of The People
 Phil Hall (journalist), Editor from 1995-2000 of the News of the World
 Barry Kyle (born 1947) theatre director
 Victor Maddern (1928–1993) actor
 Allan McKeown (1946–2013) TV producer (Auf Wiedersehen, Pet), married to Tracey Ullman
 Ian Ridpath (born 1947) astronomer and writer

References

External links 
 

1931 establishments in England
Secondary schools in the London Borough of Redbridge
Educational institutions established in 1931
Academies in the London Borough of Redbridge